Deanscales is a hamlet in the Allerdale district, in the county of Cumbria, England. Nearby settlements include the village of Dean and the town of Cockermouth. Deanscales is on the A5086 road. Deanscales has 1 pub.

See also

Listed buildings in Dean, Cumbria

External links
  Cumbria County History Trust: Dean (nb: provisional research only - see Talk page)

Hamlets in Cumbria
Dean, Cumbria